Albèrt Arnavièlha (Albert Arnavielle in French) was an Occitan poet and journalist born in Alès on 22 July 1844. He died in Montpellier on 11 November 1927. He wrote both in French and Occitan and was a majoral of Frederic Mistral's Felibritge. He also was a royalist militant for Action française and a close friend of Charles Maurras's.

Main works
 Lous Cants de l'aubo ("Morning Songs"), Nîmes, J. Roumieux, 1868.
 Per Toulouso, au noum de Diéu ("For Toulouse, in God's name"), Alès, J. Martin, 1875.
 Lous Gorbs ("The Baskets"), Montpellier, Hamelin et frères, 1880.
 Pouẽsìos dau troubaire-massou Matiéu Lacroix ("Poems by the Troubadour and masseur named Matthieu Lacroix"), La Grand-Combe, D. Coronel, 1899.
 Las Raiolos ("The Raviolis"), Montpellier, Éditions Languedociennes, 1932.

External links
Histoire du Félibrige
Lous Cants de l'aubo
La littérature d'oc dans les cantons d'Alès

1844 births
1927 deaths
People from Alès
Occitan-language writers
People affiliated with Action Française